Cyana tegyra is a moth of the family Erebidae. It was described by Herbert Druce in 1899. It is found on New Guinea.

Subspecies
 Cyana tegyra postdivisa Rothschild, 1913
 Cyana tegyra tegyra Druce, 1899

References

Cyana
Moths described in 1899